Tibro Municipality (Tibro kommun) is a municipality in Västra Götaland County in western Sweden. Its seat is located in the town of Tibro. Fagersanna is the only other population center in the municipality.

Sports
The sports club Tibro AIK FK is located in Tibro Municipality. 

The famous tennis player Robin Söderling and ice hockey player Anton Strålman come from Tibro.

References

External links

Tibro Municipality - Official site

Municipalities of Västra Götaland County
Skaraborg